The National Historic Landmarks (NHLs) in the U.S. state of Missouri represent Missouri's history from the Lewis and Clark Expedition, through the American Civil War, the Civil Rights Movement, and the Space Age. There are 37 National Historic Landmarks in Missouri. One site in Missouri was once a National Historic Landmark but later had its designation withdrawn when it failed to meet the program's criteria for inclusion. The NHLs are distributed across fifteen of Missouri's 114 counties and one independent city, with a concentration of fifteen landmarks in the state's only independent city, St. Louis.

The National Park Service (NPS), a branch of the U.S. Department of the Interior, administers the National Historic Landmark program. The NPS is responsible for determining which sites meet the criteria for designation or withdrawal as an NHL as well as identifying potential candidates for the program, through theme studies. The NPS and the National Park System Advisory Board then meet to determine the historical significance of these candidates. The final decision regarding a site's designation as a National Historic Landmark is made by the U.S. Secretary of the Interior. However, the owner of a property may object to the designation of that property as an NHL. In such cases, the site is only "eligible for designation." A property eligible for NHL status is also eligible for listing on the National Register of Historic Places (NRHP). Designated National Historic Landmarks are listed on the NRHP, which includes historic properties that the National Park Service has determined to be worthy of preservation. While NHL areas are deemed to carry national historic significance, other NRHP properties may only be significant at local or state levels.

Five historic sites in Missouri are in the U.S. National Park system. These are automatically listed in the NRHP and include one U.S. National Monument, one National Memorial, one National Battlefield, and two National Historic Sites.

Current National Historic Landmarks

|}

Historic National Park Service areas
National Historical Parks, some National Historic Sites, some National Monuments, and certain other areas in the National Park system are highly protected historic landmarks of national importance, often listed before the inauguration of the NHL program in 1960 and not later named NHLs. There are five of these areas in Missouri. However, these five are listed by the National Park Service together with the other NHLs in Missouri.

Former National Historic Landmarks
If an area currently designated as a National Historic Landmark is no longer eligible under the criteria for inclusion, its designation may be withdrawn. This usually occurs when the property undergoes any change that reduces or eliminates its national significance, usually demolition, addition, or other alterations. NHL status can be considered for withdrawal at the request of a property's owner or by the Secretary of the Interior. However, a former NHL can still remain on the National Register of Historic Places if it meets the necessary criteria for that listing. As of January 2009, only 28 sites are former (delisted) NHLs.

Notes

References

See also
National Register of Historic Places listings in Missouri
List of U.S. National Historic Landmarks by state
List of areas in the United States National Park System
List of National Natural Landmarks in Missouri

External links 
 National Historic Landmarks Program, at National Park Service
 National Park Service listings of National Historic Landmarks
 NPS Focus

Missouri
National Historic Landmarks in Missouri
National Historic Landmarks
National Historic Landmarks